Maeda (前田 lit. "previous rice field") is a Japanese surname. An archaic romanization includes Mayeda. It can refer to:

People

Maeda clan
One of the traditional Japanese clans and prominent family during the Sengoku period of Japanese history:
Maeda Toshimasa, daimyō, vassal of Oda Nobuhide
Maeda Toshiie, son of Maeda Toshimasa, famous as million-koku daimyō
Maeda Toshinaga, eldest son of Maeda Toshiie
Maeda Toshitsune, brother and heir to Maeda Toshinaga
Maeda Keiji, nephew of Maeda Toshiie by Toshihisa Maeda
Marquis Toshinari Maeda, World War II general

Others
Ai Maeda (voice actress) (born 1975), voice actor
Ai Maeda (actress), actress
Aki Maeda, actress and singer
Akira Maeda, professional wrestler
Atsuko Maeda, actress and singer
, Japanese Paralympic swimmer
Maeda Genzō, early photographer
Daizen Maeda, Japanese footballer
Gōki Maeda, actor
Gordon Maeda, Japanese–American actor
Hiroshi Maeda, stuntman and suit actor
Hiroshi Maeda (chemist), chemist known for EPR effect
Hirotake Maeda, historian
, Japanese long-distance runner
John Maeda, graphic designer and computer scientist
Jun Maeda, writer, lyricist, composer
Kaoru Maeda, professional wrestler
Kazuhiro Maeda, long-distance runner
, Japanese basketball coach
Kenta Maeda, baseball pitcher
Kentaro Maeda, actor, portrays Ikki Igarashi in Kamen Rider Revice
Mahiro Maeda, artist, writer and director of anime
Michiko Maeda, film and television actress
Mitsuyo Maeda, judoka, fundamental to the creation of Brazilian Jiu-Jitsu
, Japanese table tennis player
, Japanese badminton player
, Japanese speed skater
Naoki Maeda (disambiguation), multiple people
, Japanese go player
Nobuteru Maeda, vocalist
Nobuyo Maeda, geneticist and medical researcher
, Japanese jazz composer and pianist
Ryoichi Maeda, Japanese footballer
Maeda Seison, Nihonga painter
, Japanese golfer
Shinzo Maeda, photographer
Steven Maeda, television writer
Tadashi Maeda (admiral), admiral
Tatsuyuki Maeda, video game composer
, Japanese banker and chief executive
Thomas Aquino Manyo Maeda, Cardinal of the Catholic Church
Toshio Maeda, Japanese manga artist
Yonezō Maeda, politician, cabinet minister
, Japanese enka singer
Yuuka Maeda, member of Jpop group S/mileage

Fictional characters
Maeda (Asobi Asobase), from the manga series Asobi Asobase
Akira Maeda, a character in the manga Cromartie High School
Ema Maeda, from Love Hina
Hayato Maeda (Chumley Huffington), from Yu-Gi-Oh! GX
Kunihiko Maeda, from the Parasite Eve video game
Kazuya Maeda, from Photo Kano
Kenta Maeda, from the webcomic My Impossible Soulmate

Companies
Maeda Corporation, a holding company 
Maeda Industries (formerly Maeda Iron Works Company), a manufacturer of SunTour bicycle drive-train components

Japanese-language surnames